The 1948 United States presidential election in Nebraska took place on November 2, 1948, as part of the 1948 United States presidential election. Voters chose six representatives, or electors, to the Electoral College, who voted for president and vice president.

Nebraska was won by Governor Thomas Dewey (R–New York), running with Governor Earl Warren, with 54.15% of the popular vote, against incumbent President Harry S. Truman (D–Missouri), running with Senator Alben W. Barkley, with 45.85% of the popular vote. As of the 2020 presidential election, this is the last occasion Wheeler County has voted for a Democratic presidential candidate.

With 54.15% of the popular vote, Nebraska would prove to be Dewey's third strongest state in the nation after Vermont and Maine.

Results

Results by county

See also
 United States presidential elections in Nebraska

Notes

References

Nebraska
1948
1948 Nebraska elections